Jud is a rural hamlet in LaMoure County, North Dakota, United States. The population was 65 at the 2020 census. Jud was founded in 1904 and named for county settler Judson LaMoure.

Geography
Jud is geographically located at  (46.524984, -98.898191).

Demographics

2010 census
As of the census of 2010, there were 72 people, 42 households, and 19 families residing in the city. The racial makeup of the city was 97.2% White and 2.8% from two or more races.

There were 42 households, of which 11.9% had children under the age of 18 living with them, 40.5% were married couples living together, 2.4% had a female householder with no husband present, 2.4% had a male householder with no wife present, and 54.8% were non-families. 50.0% of all households were made up of individuals, and 23.8% had someone living alone who was 65 years of age or older. The average household size was 1.67 and the average family size was 2.32.

The median age in the city was 54 years. 9.7% of residents were under the age of 18; 4.3% were between the ages of 18 and 24; 16.7% were from 25 to 44; 45.8% were from 45 to 64; and 23.6% were 65 years of age or older. The gender makeup of the city was 50.0% male and 50.0% female.

2000 census
As of the census of 2000, there were 76 people, 43 households, and 20 families residing in the city. The population density was 313.2 people per square mile (122.3/km2). There were 51 housing units at an average density of 210.2 per square mile (82.0/km2). The racial makeup of the city was 98.68% White and 1.32% Asian.

There were 43 households, out of which 14.0% had children under the age of 18 living with them, 39.5% were married couples living together, 7.0% had a female householder with no husband present, and 51.2% were non-families. 48.8% of all households were made up of individuals, and 32.6% had someone living alone who was 65 years of age or older. The average household size was 1.72 and the average family size was 2.29.

In the city, the population was spread out, with 11.8% under the age of 18, 26.3% from 25 to 44, 18.4% from 45 to 64, and 43.4% who were 65 years of age or older. The median age was 54 years. For every 100 females, there were 100.0 males. For every 100 females age 18 and over, there were 103.0 males.

The median income for a household in the city was $22,857, and the median income for a family was $34,375. Males had a median income of $36,250 versus $16,250 for females. The per capita income for the city was $17,095. There were no families and 22.2% of the population living below the poverty line, including no under eighteens and 18.8% of those over 64.

Climate
This climatic region is typified by large seasonal temperature differences, with warm to hot (and often humid) summers and cold (sometimes severely cold) winters.  According to the Köppen Climate Classification system, Jud has a humid continental climate, abbreviated "Dfb" on climate maps.

Notable People
 Lucas Nitschke 
 Tatonka Nitschke

See also
 Dagen's Grocery

References

External links
1955 golden jubilee, Jud, North Dakota, June 24-25 from the Digital Horizons website

Cities in North Dakota
Cities in LaMoure County, North Dakota
Populated places established in 1904
1904 establishments in North Dakota